Teddy Edward is a British television series for children. It was based on the books by Patrick and Mollie Matthews, about the travels of a teddy bear. The series of 13 episodes was first transmitted in 1973, and often repeated until 1980.

Each episode consisted of a story narrated by Richard Baker, illustrated by still photographs of Teddy Edward and his friends. Teddy Edward's travelling companions included Jasmine the Rabbit, Snowytoes the Panda and Bushy the Bushbaby.

The series was directed by Howard Kennett. The distinctive theme tune was "Glad Gadabout" by Johnny Scott.

The series was also exported to New Zealand, Norway, Finland, Singapore and Albania.

Episode titles

 "The Ugly Duckling"
 "Snow"
 "Hide And Seek"
 "Rain"
 "Visitor"
 "Farm"
 "Red Indians"
 "Sandcastle"
 "Jasmine's Present"
 "Contraption"
 "Picnic"
 "Dream"
 "Cornfield"

References

External links
 

BBC children's television shows
1973 British television series debuts
Fictional teddy bears
Television series about bears
Sentient toys in fiction